The Orange Belt Railway (later known as the Sanford & St. Petersburg Railroad) was a  narrow gauge railroad established in 1885 by Russian exile Peter Demens in Florida. It was one of the longest narrow gauge railroads in the United States at the time of its completion in 1888, with a mainline  in length between Sanford and St. Petersburg. It carried citrus, vegetables, and passengers; and it interchanged with two standard gauge lines: the Jacksonville, Tampa and Key West Railway at Lake Monroe, and the Florida Central and Peninsular Railroad at Lacoochee.

The railway changed hands several times in its early years due to debt run up during various phases of construction and a citrus freeze that affected freight cargo. Demens lost the railroad to financier Edward Stotesbury, who reorganized it as the Sanford & St. Petersburg Railroad in 1893. After the Great Freeze of 1894–95, the railroad was put up for sale. It was purchased by Henry B. Plant in 1895, who converted it to standard gauge, and made it part of the Plant System.  Plant would build a hotel along the line, the Belleview-Biltmore Hotel near Clearwater, in 1897.  The Plant System became part of the Atlantic Coast Line Railroad system in 1902. The Orange Belt Railway line brought settlers to towns along its route and fostered development in the region.  Sections are now part of rail to trails programs.

A 2012 musical titled "Orange Belt Railroad" and based on the railroad line's history was created by Richard J. Budin, a member of West Coast Players in Clearwater, Florida.

History

Construction and early years
The original Orange Belt Railway was chartered in 1885 by men seeking to build a 35-mile  gauge line from Lake Monroe (part of the St. Johns River) to Lake Apopka in Florida. They purchased $9,400 worth of crossties from Russian immigrant Peter Demens' sawmill in Longwood, and had to turn over their railroad when they were unable to pay. Demens formed the Orange Belt Investment Co., borrowed money from friends, and launched a $50,000 bond issue to complete the rail line to Oakland, east of Clermont.

Oakland pioneer James Gamble Speer gave Demens a half-interest in 200 acres to encourage Demens to bring the railroad line to Oakland. Demens agreed to move the headquarters and train maintenance shop of his Orange Belt Improvement Co. to Oakland from Longwood. Soon after the first train reached Oakland in November 1886, Demens decided to extend the line 110 miles to the Gulf of Mexico.

The Armour meat packing family in Chicago helped fund the line's extension from Trilby to San Antonio (Florida). The first train carried construction materials and arrived in San Antonio on November 27, 1887. The first passenger train arrived in San Antonio on February 13, 1888.

Demens countered with a demand of an additional  but Disston refused, mistakenly believing that Disston City would thrive if the railroad merely came close to the area. Disston City never met Disston's expectations, and it became the small city of Gulfport. Around the same time, John Constantine Williams negotiated with Demens and offered part of his land holdings in exchange for a southern terminus near what Demens named St. Petersburg, after his childhood home in Russia.

On January 13, 1888, the Orange Belt Railway reached Tarpon Springs; on May 1, 1888, it was completed to St. Petersburg.  The rail line played a major role in the development of several towns along its route including San Antonio, Sutherland (now Palm Harbor), Ozona, Dunedin, Clearwater, and Largo.

A lot of debt was run up in order to get the line completed and it was sold by Demens in 1889. The railroad entered receivership in 1893 and was sold by the court right back to its owners, who reorganized it as the Sanford and St. Petersburg Railroad. The Great Freeze of 1894–95 damaged citrus trees and hurt the citrus trade's freight business, causing the line to be sold to Henry B. Plant in 1895. Trilby was the location of a junction with the South Florida Railroad's line from Lakeland to Inverness, which was built in 1891.

Atlantic Coast Line ownership

The Plant System became part of the Atlantic Coast Line Railroad in 1902.  By this time, seven miles of the line had been removed between Sanford and Sylvan Lake with the former Sanford and Lake Eustis Railway (another Plant System/Atlantic Coast Line route) providing that connection as it was more direct.  Under the Atlantic Coast Line's ownership, the line was designated as the Trilby Branch (T Branch) from Sylvan Lake to Trilby, and from Trilby west it was designated as the Trilby–St. Petersburg Line (RE Line).  The line from Trilby to St. Petersburg would become the route of the St. Petersburg section of the Atlantic Coast Line's West Coast Champion.  By 1949, this segment was served daily by the West Coast Champion, the Southland, an additional local passenger train, and a local freight train.   At the same time, a daily mixed train operated from Sanford to Trilby.

Later years
The Atlantic Coast Line merged with its rival, the Seaboard Air Line Railroad, in 1967 to form the Seaboard Coast Line Railroad (SCL).  The line remained mostly intact after the merger, though its importance to the combined SCL was diminished.  By then, track east of Trilby was freight-only.  The section from Trilby to St. Petersburg was then known as the St. Petersburg Subdivision.  The Champion continued to run the line from Trilby to St. Petersburg along with a local passenger train and a local freight train after the merger.  The Silver Star was also rerouted on to the line from just south of Clearwater (where it joined from the former Seaboard Air Line track) to St. Petersburg.  Passenger service north of Clearwater was discontinued in 1971 after the Seaboard Coast Line's passenger service was taken over by Amtrak.  Though, Amtrak would continue to run the Silver Star, the Floridian, and the Champion (which was replaced by the Silver Meteor in 1979) from Clearwater to St. Petersburg until 1984, when all passenger service to Pinellas County was discontinued.  By 1972, freight service was discontinued on much of the line, and by 1978, tracks were removed between Tarpon Springs and Groveland.  Remaining track from Belleair to Tarpon Springs was then designated the Dunedin Subdivision while track south to St. Petersburg became part of the Yeoman Subdivision (which included the ex-SAL line from Clearwater to Tampa).

In 1980, the Seaboard Coast Line's parent company merged with the Chessie System, creating the CSX Corporation.  The CSX Corporation initially operated the Chessie and Seaboard Systems separately until 1986, when they were merged into CSX Transportation.  During the transition into CSX, the company sought to abandon many redundant routes and sell others to shortlines.  In 1986, the company announced its intention to abandon more of the remaining Orange Belt line between Tarpon Springs and Clearwater, which had not seen any rail traffic since the early part of the decade. Before the abandonment, the city of Tarpon Springs was granted permission by CSX in 1987 to run six final round-trip passenger runs on the line to Dunedin to commemorate the 100th anniversary of the incorporation of Tarpon Springs as a city, an event which immediately sold out. The tracks were removed immediately afterwards, 99 years after their installation.

Current conditions

Today, there are segments of the Orange Belt Railway that are still active. Most notably, a section of the line running from Clearwater southeast to St. Petersburg remains active and is currently part of CSX's Clearwater Subdivision. Additionally, a 3-mile segment of the line in Central Florida from southwest of Forest City to Clarcona is still active, and is operated by the Florida Central Railroad.

Many abandoned sections of the rail line have since become rail trails.  These include:
 Pinellas Trail
 South Lake-Lake Minneola Scenic Trail
 West Orange Trail
 Seminole-Wekiva Trail

Historic stations

References

Further reading
Orange Belt Railway equipment roster
Map of railline
List of coordinates that the railroad reached

1885 establishments in Florida
3 ft gauge railways in the United States
Defunct Florida railroads
Predecessors of the Atlantic Coast Line Railroad
Railway companies established in 1885
Railway companies disestablished in 1895